Malčín is a municipality and village in Havlíčkův Brod District in the Vysočina Region of the Czech Republic. It has about 200 inhabitants.

Administrative parts
The hamlet of Dobrá Voda is an administrative part of Malčín.

References

Villages in Havlíčkův Brod District